The 1976–77 season was the 68th year of football played by Dundee United, and covers the period from 1 July 1976 to 30 June 1977. United finished in fourth place, securing UEFA Cup football for the following season.

Match results
Dundee United played a total of 44 competitive matches during the 1976–77 season.

Legend

All results are written with Dundee United's score first.
Own goals in italics

Premier Division

Scottish Cup

League Cup

Anglo-Scottish Cup

League table

References

See also
 1976–77 in Scottish football

Dundee United F.C. seasons
Dundee United